"Imperial Hotel" is a single released by American singer Stevie Nicks from her album Rock a Little. The song was dedicated to keyboardist Benmont Tench. The single was released only in Australia, where it peaked at No. 99 in October 1986. The song was co-written by Tom Petty and the Heartbreakers guitarist Mike Campbell. Heartbreakers Mike Campbell and Benmont Tench are featured on the track.

Personnel
 Stevie Nicks – vocals
 Sharon Celani – backing vocals
 Lori Nicks – backing vocals
 Mike Campbell – guitar
 Marilyn Martin – backing vocals
 Steven Jordan – drums
 Benmont Tench – organ

Charts

References

1986 songs
1986 singles
Songs written by Stevie Nicks
Songs written by Mike Campbell (musician)
Reprise Records singles